The 1934 Cupa României Final was the first final of Romania's most prestigious football cup competition. It was disputed between Ripensia Timișoara and Universitatea Cluj, and was initially played on 8 September 1934 in Timișoara.

After losing 3-2, Universitatea Cluj contested the decision to stage the game in the opponent's hometown, and insisted the final to be replayed on a neutral venue.  The objection was accepted, and a replay took place on 30 September 1934 in Bucharest. Ripensia won again, this time by a five goals margin, and became the first winners of the Romanian Cup.

Both teams played in 1–2–3–5 formula, 1 GK, 2 DF, 3 MF and 5 FW.

The first game played at Timișoara on 8 September 1934 was contested by Universitatea Cluj which required the match to be played at a neutral stadium.

The second game replayed at Bucharest on 30 September 1934, was won categorically by Ripensia Timișoara by five goals to nil.

This final remain in history for the circumstances of being played twice, both wins for Timișoara team.

Match details

Replay

See also 
List of Cupa României finals

References

External links
romaniansoccer.ro

Cupa
Romania
FC Universitatea Cluj matches